Duke George Augustus of Mecklenburg (16 August 1748 – 14 November 1785) was a German nobleman, sailor, and soldier.

Early life
Duke George Augustus was born in Mirow the youngest child of Duke Charles Louis Frederick of Mecklenburg and his wife Princess Elisabeth Albertine of Saxe-Hildburghausen. His grandfather Adolf Frederick II, Duke of Mecklenburg-Strelitz was the founder of the House of Mecklenburg-Strelitz.

On 8 September 1761 his sister Charlotte married the King of Great Britain, George III. Following the marriage George Augustus moved to the Kingdom of Great Britain and after learning the English language volunteered to serve in the Royal Navy. He spent two years serving in the Navy before he was forced to leave due to illness brought on by the climate and life at sea. During his time in Great Britain George Augustus became a Doctor of Laws and attended observations of the 1769 Transit of Venus at the King's Observatory in Richmond-upon-Thames.

George Augustus developed a love of Britain and though a firm Protestant himself, he disapproved of the country's discrimination and intolerance of Catholics.

Imperial service
After recovering from his illness George Augustus spent some time studying at the University of Leiden before being invited to enter into the service of the Queen-Empress Maria Theresa of Austria. He accepted the offer and was made a lieutenant-colonel. He was promoted to rank of colonel after a fellow officer complained to Empress Maria Theresa that Duke George Augustus associated with socially inferior officers and that he had forgot that he was a German prince. The Empress who was only concerned if George Augustus had forgotten that he was Lieutenant-Colonel in her service, responded by promoting him to the rank of Colonel after the complaining officer admitted he was a good officer as she was only interested that he did his duty as an officer in her service.

He continued his rise up the ranks and a short while after being made a colonel he was made 'General of Horse' and was decorated with various honours. In 1780 he was promoted to the rank of brigadier-general and was appointed inspector of two carabinier regiments. He won the praise of Austrian field marshal Baron Ernst Gideon von Laudon in 1782 after carrying out army manœuvres in Prague with 50,000 infantry and cavalry soldiers.

Duke George Augustus never married and died in Tyrnau in the Kingdom of Hungary at the age of 37. He was buried in Mirow in 1852.

Ancestry

References

House of Mecklenburg-Strelitz
Royal Navy officers
Leiden University alumni
People from Mirow
1748 births
1785 deaths
Military personnel from Mecklenburg-Western Pomerania